Umi or UMI may refer to:

Geography
 Umi, Iran, a village in Razavi Khorasan Province, Iran
 Umi, Fukuoka, a town in Japan

People
 Umi-a-Liloa, king of the island of Hawaii
Umi Dachlan, Indonesian female artist
Umi Garrett, American female pianist.
 Umi (singer), Tierra Umi Wilson (born 1999), American singer and songwriter
 "Umi" (song), ("海", literally 'ocean') Japanese language sone by Japanese band Lead, 2007
Umi Tenjin, Japanese voice actress

Fictional characters
 Umi Ryuzaki, a character in the fictional manga series Magic Knight Rayearth
 Umi Sonoda, a character in Love Live! School Idol Project

Acronyms
 UMI AMD, a computer interconnect
 Italian Mathematical Union, an Italian mathematics society
 Uganda Management Institute, a business education institute in Kampala, Uganda
 Union Mundial pro Interlingua, an organization related to the international language Interlingua
 Methodist University of Indonesia (Universitas Methodist Indonesia), a university in Medan, Indonesia
 University Microfilms International, a microfilm publisher
 Urban Ministries, Inc., an American Christian media company
 Ursa Minor (UMi), a constellation
 Unique molecular identifier, a technique used in molecular biology research
 United States Minor Outlying Islands, ISO_3166 Alpha-3 code of United States Minor Outlying Islands consisting of eight United States insular areas in the Pacific Ocean

Japanese feminine given names